Carlyss (pronounced ‘car-liss’) is a census-designated place (CDP) in Calcasieu Parish, Louisiana, United States. The population was 5,101 in 2020. It is part of the Lake Charles metropolitan statistical area.

Geography
Carlyss is located south of the center of Calcasieu Parish at  (30.192655, -93.374104). It is bordered to the north by the city of Sulphur. Interstate 10 follows the northern border, with access from exits 20 and 21. I-10 leads east  to Lake Charles and west  to Orange, Texas. Louisiana Highway 27 runs through the center of Carlyss, connecting Sulphur to the north with Holly Beach on the Gulf of Mexico,  to the south.

Demographics

As of the 2020 United States census, there were 5,101 people, 1,773 households, and 1,252 families residing in the CDP.

References

Census-designated places in Calcasieu Parish, Louisiana
Census-designated places in Louisiana
Census-designated places in Lake Charles metropolitan area